The revenue cutter George M. Bibb was an iron-hulled steamboat built at Pittsburgh in 1845, named after the then-Secretary of the Treasury George M. Bibb, which served on blockade duty during the war with Mexico in 1846, and was transferred to the U.S. Coast Survey in 1847. Its engines were salvaged for a second Bibb that is sometimes considered to be a rebuild of the George M. Bibb.

Design and construction 
The shipbuilding industry in Pittsburgh and the rest of the United States had declined after the War of 1812. The advent of steam propulsion and iron hulls put Pittsburgh back in the business, however, and the federal government would take a leading role in reviving Pittsburgh's role as a builder of ships for both fresh- and salt-water service.

On 9 September 1841, Congress authorized the construction of an iron-hulled steamboat for Great Lakes service. It would be completely assembled, then broken down and hauled in sections to Erie along the Beaver Division of the Pennsylvania Canal. Michigan would be the first iron warship in the United States Navy.

Soon after construction on Michigan began, the Revenue Marine ordered three iron steamers from the firm of Freeman, Knapp and Totten; these would be built at the Fort Pitt Foundry, across the Allegheny from Pittsburgh. The first of these, the screw-driven  was constructed in a fashion similar to that used for Michigan; plates and frames were assembled at the Fort Pitt works, then transported by canal boat to Oswego on Lake Ontario. A second,  was completed at Pittsburgh, then towed to New Orleans to be fitted out for service in the Gulf of Mexico.

The third of the Freeman, Knapp and Totten cutters was the George M. Bibb (briefly named Tyler), which was designed around the "Hunter wheel" (also, "Hunter's wheel") an experiment that featured paddle wheels mounted horizontally in the hull, rather than vertically on each side. This scheme was the brainchild of Lt. William W. Hunter, and it enjoyed a brief vogue in the mid-1840s before the superiority of Ericsson's screw was demonstrated. The paddle wheels were enclosed in chests, or cases, below the ship's waterline; only the paddles themselves extended from the vessel's sides. "Hunter's wheels" promised a great deal, including added protection from enemy shell fire, a lower center of gravity, and (it was hoped) increased efficiency and speed; the design was conceived at a time when hydrodynamics was little understood, and proved a complete failure.

Bibb was launched on March 8, 1845 without warning, and as spectators scrambled out of the way, two workmen were injured, one fatally. She took on her armament of eight guns at the docks in Pittsburgh and set off down the Ohio for New Orleans. She made it to Cincinnati, but at that place sprang a leak that left her on the river bottom in a matter of hours.

The inquiry into Bibbs condition found that a packing around the shaft of one of the paddle wheels was to blame, rather than any fault of design. Nevertheless, the Treasury Department ordered that the cutter be rebuilt at Cincinnati with stronger frames, a more powerful engine and conventional side-mounted paddle wheels.

Service with the Revenue Marine 
By 1846, reconstruction was complete, and Bibb was on station at New Orleans under the command of Capt. Winslow Foster; she operated out of there until 18 May 1846, when she was ordered to blockade duty off the coast of Mexico, with 10 other cutters. With her sisters, Bibb spent her wartime service in support of the larger vessels in the American blockade, scouting coastal waters, carrying mail and supplies, and convoying or towing ships. After returning to New Orleans, she departed for Boston on 31 May 1847, arriving on 11 July.

Coast Survey and the second Bibb 
Upon arrival in Boston, Bibb was transferred to the United States Coast Survey. Although sources diverge on her future history, Bibbs engines were salvaged for a new revenue cutter, which was built at the Boston Navy Yard in 1853. Many authorities, including the Coast Guard Historian's office, consider this second Bibb to simply be a rebuild of the first.

References 

Ships of the United States Revenue Cutter Service
Steamships
1845 ships